WCKM-FM (98.5 MHz) and WDKM (92.5 MHz) are a pair of commercial FM radio stations simulcasting a classic hits format.  The stations are owned by Regional Radio Group, LLC and features news and sports from ABC Radio.

WCKM-FM is licensed to Lake George, New York, and WDKM is licensed to Poultney, Vermont.  They serves Essex, Hamilton, Saratoga, Warren and Washington Counties in New York State and Rutland County, Vermont.

References

External links

CKM-FM
Classic hits radio stations in the United States
Radio stations established in 1994
1994 establishments in New York (state)